The Chaotic Wrestling (CW) Television Championship was a professional wrestling title in American independent promotion Chaotic Wrestling. The title was first won by "Latin Fury" Luis Ortiz in Revere, Massachusetts on February 23, 2001. There have been a total of 4 recognized individual champions, who have had a combined 6 official reigns. On February 2, 2002, after being unified with the CW Light Heavyweight Championship, Dukes Dalton retires both titles after winning the New England Championship on February 16.

Title history

References

External links
Chaotic Wrestling Light Heavyweight Championship Title History

Chaotic Wrestling championships
Television wrestling championships